Jeziory  is a village in the administrative district of Gmina Mosina, within Poznań County, Greater Poland Voivodeship, in west-central Poland. It lies within Wielkopolska National Park, and is the site of the Park's administrative offices.

References

Villages in Poznań County